The 2015 Bulgarian Supercup was the 13th Bulgarian Supercup, an annual Bulgarian football match played between the winners of the previous season's A Football Group and Bulgarian Cup. The game was played between Cherno More Varna, who beat Levski Sofia to win the 2015 Bulgarian Cup Final, and Ludogorets Razgrad, champions of the 2014–15 A Group. 

This was Ludogorets's fourth Bulgarian Supercup appearance and Cherno More's first. Watched by a crowd of 3,600 at Lazur Stadium in Burgas, Cherno More won the match 1–0.

Match details

References

2015
Supercup
PFC Cherno More Varna matches
PFC Ludogorets Razgrad matches